Zhang Shunyin (born 15 March 1984) is a Chinese rower. He competed in the men's eight event at the 2008 Summer Olympics.

References

1984 births
Living people
Chinese male rowers
Olympic rowers of China
Rowers at the 2008 Summer Olympics
Rowers from Sichuan